Puccinellia macra is a perennial grass which grows on the coasts of south-eastern Canada. Its specific epithet "macra" means large, referring to its tall stature.

Description

Its basal sheaths are somewhat purple.
The grass flowers in August.

P. macra is somewhat unique morphologically in its genus, resembling Puccinellia nutkaensis but differing in its softer and more pubescent lemmas.

Habitat and distribution

Puccinellia macra grows on sea cliffs and in coastal sands in eastern Gaspé County in Quebec.

References

macra
Plants described in 1916